Vinkenti Peev was a Bulgarian Catholic priest, Capuchin friar and Vicar Apostolic of the Roman Catholic Diocese of Sofia and Plovdiv.

Life 
Peev was born on 11 November 1873 in the Bulgarian town of Baltadzhii (today Rakovski). In 1897 he was ordained as a priest. On 13 December 1912 he was appointed Coadjutor Vicar Apostolic of Sofia and Plovdiv and Titular Bishop of Lyrbe. On 3 February 1913 he was consecrated a bishop. He succeeded Archbishop Roberto Menini on 14 October 1916 as Vicar Apostolic of Sofia and Plovdiv.
 
Bishop Peev died on 2 March 1941 in Sofia.

References

External links
History of the Roman Catholic Church in Burgas

20th-century Roman Catholic bishops in Bulgaria
1873 births
1941 deaths
Capuchins
Capuchin bishops
20th-century Roman Catholic titular bishops
People from Rakovski
Bulgarian Catholics